Thangavelu Engineering College is an educational institute located on Old Mahabalipuram Road, Chennai, Tamil Nadu, India. It is affiliated with Anna University, Chennai.

History
Thangavelu Engineering College was founded in Salem in 1994 by the Ponniamman Education trust by the chairman Mr. K.V. Thangkabalu. After a few years the college was moved to Chennai, in the location of Karapakkam in Rajiv Gandhi Salai.

Academics
TEC offers bachelor's degrees in engineering, and master's degrees in engineering, computers and business. This campus also contains three colleges named T.J Institute of Technology, and DaVinci School of Design and Architecture.

Admission
Admission through Director of technical education of Anna University
Prospectus and application forms for all courses are available at the college as well as at the Corporate Office.

References

External links
 http://www.thangavelu.edu.in/

All India Council for Technical Education
Engineering colleges in Chennai
Colleges affiliated to Anna University
Educational institutions established in 1994
1994 establishments in Tamil Nadu